Freemasonry or Masonry refers to a civic movement promoting fraternity and good works. Freemasonry defines itself as “a regular system of morality, veiled in allegory and illustrated by symbols.” In particular masonic meetings are characterized by initiations and rituals. As such masonry has been viewed historically by churches and governments as secret societies.

Its historical origins date as far back to 1717 in England, during the Enlightenment period. During that time, an intellectual movement arose throughout Europe based on rationalism, which held that only eternal truths could be attained by reason alone.

Members are organized into lodges, the basic organizational structure, which operates under the jurisdiction of a grand lodge.

Rise of Freemasonry in the Philippines

“Primera Luz Filipina”, the first masonic lodge in the Philippines was established in 1856 by Jose Malcampo Monje, a naval captain who became the Governor-General of the Philippines from June 18, 1874, to February 28, 1877. It was placed under the jurisdiction of “Gran Oriente Luisitano” and admitted only Spaniards. Other lodges for foreign-born residents soon followed.

Sometime in 1869, Jacobo Zobel y Zangroniz joined the Scottish Lodge based in Nagtahan, which had been founded by the British Consul-General. It was placed under the jurisdiction of the grand lodge of Hong Kong. Zobel was made secretary of the organization. Historian Teodoro M. Kalaw wrote that Zobel was the first Filipino mason and added considerable prestige, considering that Zobel was a highly educated man who was a member of the Spanish Academy of History.

In July 4, 1924 - The Filipino body, in a General assembly attended by more than 300 Master Masons from all over the country, unanimously adopted a proclamation saying that the Philippines is an exclusively Filipino Masonic Territory under the jurisdiction of Supremo Concejo del Grado 33 Para Filipinas headed by Soverano Gran Commendador Timoteo Paez and his council were Dr. Barcelona, Judge Rodas, Geronimo Santiago, Atty. Ruperto Castillo Tirol, Atty. Francisco Varona, Don Vicente Liwanag, Elias Asuncion and others. The Supreme Council was founded by acclamation by Filipino Masons at a time when no other such council existed in the Philippines.

After its constitution, the existence of the Supremo Concejo del Grado 33 Para Filipinas was formally proclaimed to the four corners of the world on December 30 - Rizal Day - of the same year.

Zobel himself wrote:
“Bajo estas circumstancias mis pensamientos se dirigieron—y no solamente los míos—á la única organización que podía reunir todos los elementos liberales españoles del Archipiélago y del gobierno en Manila para conseguir la conservación y el desarrollo sano de esta colonia tan importante para España. Esta organización es la masoneria bastanda propagada en España y sus colonia y enemiga del clero católico.”

(Under these circumstances my thoughts were directed — and not only mine — to the only organization that could bring together all the Spanish liberal elements of the Archipelago and the government in Manila to achieve the conservation and healthy development of this important colony for Spain. This organization is the bastard masonry propagated in Spain and its colony and is enemy of the Catholic clergy)

Spread of Masonry among the Intelligentsia
It was a group of young Filipino students studying in Spain who helped spread the movement rapidly in Philippine circles: Marcelo H. del Pilar, Graciano Lopez Jaena, Jose Alejandrino, Ariston Bautista, Julio Llorente, Galicano Apacible, Antonio Luna, and his brother Juan Luna, and Jose Rizal. Some of these joined Solidaridad Lodge 53 in Barcelona, Spain, and others joined Revolucion Lodge.

Upon their return to the colony, many formed lodges. On January 6, 1891, Nilad Lodge was formed in Manila. Soon others followed throughout the archipelago, even as far as Zamboanga. In 1893 these different lodges were organized under the Grand Regional Council led by Ambrocio Flores.

Such was the influence of Freemasonry in the public that even the organization Katipunan adapted masonic secret rituals and codes.

Toward independence
After the occupation of the Philippines by the United States, American soldiers stationed in the country formed their own lodges. Among the first were volunteers from North Dakota who organized the Knights Templar. A group of African American soldiers from Missouri organized the Prince Hall Grand Lodge.

The Filipinos reorganized under Grand Master Ambrocio Flores to establish the Filipino Grand Orient in 1899. During this time the Americans did not honor the existence of the First Philippine Republic despite being founded on Revolutionary French and American Masonic ideals. Despite continued protests and appeals by Filipino Masons to their brother American and European Freemasons to end hostilities and recognize the First Philippine Republic, the European and American Freemasons ignored the appeals and even worked against Philippine nationalism. For the remainder of this period, Philippine Freemasonry was subservient to the Grand Lodge of the United States of America.

On December 19, 1912, the Grand Lodge of the Philippine Islands was formed by three American lodges: Manila 342, Cavite 350, and Corregidor 386, with Manila becoming Manila Lodge No 1. At first, Grand Lodge remained a Regional Grand Lodge, convoking its own Grand Assembly in 1915. Throughout 1915 and 1916 it was engaged with correspondence with the Grande Oriente Español in Spain, with aims toward its own independence. The long process of establishing the proper agreements finished in February 1917. The American Grand Lodge Constitution was used as a basis, keeping in mind issues such as equality of all races and working languages for ceremonies. In the same month, a group of 27 lodges still under the Grande Oriente Español elected to affiliate under the Philippine Grand Lodge and Grand Officers were elected.

Second World War
The first Filipino Grand Master was Manuel Quezon (later the 2nd President of the Philippines) in 1918.  Masonry, along with much of life in the Philippines, was disrupted by the Japanese occupation during the Second World War.  For a time before and after the war, the Philippine Grand Lodge also held jurisdiction over some lodges in other countries such as China and Japan before those places established their own grand lodges.  Their constitutions were often based on the Philippine one, as well as others such as that of the Grand Lodge of California.

1919:  The Grande Oriente Español revives lodges.  Walter Bruggman and Mariano Tenorio were mandated to reorganize its symbolic lodges and revive its Scottish Rite Bodies which led to the formation of the Gran Logia Regional del Archipelago Filipino.

1924:  Disagreement causes split of Grande Oriente Español.  Some misunderstandings arose between the Grand Master of the Grand Regional Lodge and the Grand Delegate, both under the jurisdiction of Grande Oriente Español. An appeal was sent to Madrid by the Grand Master, but the Grand Delegate was sustained and given significant power.  This incident gave rise to the idea of forming the Philippine Family of Universal Freemasonry.  This did not happen however, which resulted in two separate bodies.

The Gran Logia Nacional de Filipinas under the Supremo Consejo del Grado 33° para Filipinas was founded in 1924 by Timoteo Paez.

1925:   The Gran Logia del Archipielago Filipino under the Supremo Consejo 33° del Archipielago Filipino was chartered as “Soberana e Independiente” by the Grande Oriente Español in December 1925.

1930-1937:  Grand Lodge of the Philippine Islands warrants Amity Lodge No 106 and five other lodges in China. 

1936:  Major General Douglas MacArthur was made a “Mason at Sight” on January 17, 1936, in a rare exercise of a Grand Master’s privilege by Grand Master Samuel R. Hawthorne.  MacArthur became a member of Manila Lodge No 1. 

1937:  The District Grand Lodge of China under the Grand Lodge of the Philippine Islands was inaugurated by Grand Master Joseph H. Alley on May 4, 1937, in Shanghai and installed R.W. Bro. Hua-Chuen Mei as District Grand Master.

1937:   During the Annual Communication on January 23, 1937, Magat Lodge No. 68 submitted a resolution to change the title of the Grand Lodge of Free and Accepted Masons of the Philippine Islands, to the Grand Lodge of Free and Accepted Masons of the Philippines.  This was approved and made effective in January, 1940. (Causing, 1969)  Reynold S. Fajardo dated the actual change in title on April 28, 1953. (Cabletow, 1990)

1942:  Lodges cease labors.  The Second World War and the Japanese invasion of the Philippines forced all lodges to stop activities.  Among high ranking Masons lost were Chief Justice Jose Abad Santos (PGM 1938), executed on May 7, 1942, in Malabang, Lanao;  Joseph H. Alley (PGM 1937), died  Feb 1, 1946 after his release from concentration camp;  John McFie, incumbent Grand Master killed by artillery fire at UST concentration camp during the battle of Manila, February 1945;  and his Deputy, Colonel Jose P. Guido, beheaded by the Japanese on February 7, 1945.  Another Past Grand Master (1940) General Jose delos Reyes was also killed.

Liberation Time
1945:  Lodges resume activities. Rt. Worshipful Michael Goldenberg, Senior Grand Warden reestablished the Grand Lodge of the Philippines after the liberation of the Philippines and became acting Grand Master.

1947:  Grand Lodge of the Philippines founds lodges in Japan.  After the Second World War, an English and two Scottish lodges survived in American occupied Japan.  The Americans in Japan through the Grand Lodge of the Philippines began to organize lodges. In 1950 Masonic membership became available to Japanese nationals.  During a 10-year period from 1947 to 1956, sixteen lodges were established. 

1948:  Grand Lodge of China formed.   Amity Lodge No 106 of China invited the lodges in China to a convention January 15–16, 1949. This was also attended  by lodges of other foreign Grand Jurisdictions; Massachusetts, England, Scotland, and Ireland that did not vote and only observed. The delegates resolved to form a Grand Lodge; adopted a Constitution and Regulations based on the statutes of the Grand Lodges of  California and the Philippines and elected David W. K. Au as Grand Master.

1954:  District Grand Lodge of Japan under the Grand Lodge of the Philippines was constituted on June 2, 1954.

1957: Grand Lodge of Japan formed.  At the stated meeting of Moriahyama Lodge No 134 on January 16, 1957, a resolution was unanimously passed to call all the other Lodges in Japan to a convention to consider the formation of a Grand Lodge of Japan. The first convention was held on February 16, 1957, where 11 Lodges reported their unanimous endorsement of the Resolution. On March 16, 1957, in the second convention 15 Lodges unanimously approved the Moriahyama Resolution and accordingly, the Grand Lodge of Japan was formed and its officers elected.

1974:  John O. Wallace, last of the American Grand Masters elected of the Grand Lodge of the Philippines.

See also
Katipunan
List of Freemasons

References

External links
The Philippine flag - its masonic roots
Official website
Timeline
One Pinoy Masons UK

 
Katipunan